The National Health is a 1973 British black comedy film directed by Jack Gold and starring Lynn Redgrave, Colin Blakely and Eleanor Bron. It is based on the play The National Health by Peter Nichols, in which the staff struggle to cope in a NHS hospital. The film satirically interweaves the story of the real hospital with a fantasy hospital which exists in a soap-opera world where all the equipment is new and patients are miraculously cured – although the only "patients" seen are doctors or nurses who are themselves part of the soap opera plots. In the real hospital, the patients die while the out-of-touch administrators focus on impressing foreign visitors.

Plot
Overworked doctors and nurses do their best to cope in a depressing and poorly-equipped National Health hospital.

Cast

 Lynn Redgrave as Nurse Sweet / Nurse Betty Martin
 Colin Blakely as Edward Loach
 Eleanor Bron as Sister McFee / Sister Mary MacArthur
 Donald Sinden as Mr. Carr / Senior Surgeon Boyd
 Jim Dale as Mr. Barnet / Dr. Neil Boyd
 Sheila Scott Wilkinson as Nurse Powell / Staff Nurse Cleo Norton
 Neville Aurelius as Leyland / Monk
 Gillian Barge as Dr. Bird
 George Browne as The Chaplain
 Patience Collier as The Lady Visitor
 Jumoke Debayo as Nurse Lake
 Robert Gillespie as Tyler
 John Hamill as Kenny
 Don Hawkins as Les
 James Hazeldine as Student Doctor
 Bob Hoskins as Desmond Foster
 David Hutcheson as Mr Mackie
 Mervyn Johns as Doctor Rees
 Bert Palmer as Mr Flagg
 Maureen Pryor as The Matron
 Richie Stewart as Mortuary Attendant
 Clive Swift as Mervyn Ash
 Graham Weston as Michael

References

External links
 
 
 

1973 films
British black comedy films
1970s black comedy films
Films shot at EMI-Elstree Studios
Films set in hospitals
British films based on plays
Films directed by Jack Gold
Films scored by Carl Davis
Columbia Pictures films
1973 comedy films
1973 drama films
1970s English-language films
1970s British films